Garey Earl Mathurin (born 23 September 1983 in Mon Repos, Saint Lucia) is a cricketer who plays for the West Indies at international level and for the Windward Islands domestically.

He made his Twenty20 International debut for the West Indies on 25 September 2011 against England. He finished with bowling figures of 3/9 and was named as the player of the match. He is just the third cricketer from Saint Lucia to represent the West Indies in international cricket after Johnson Charles (who made his debut just two days before Mathurin) and Darren Sammy, who was captain in Mathurin's first match.

References

Windward Islands cricketers
Saint Lucian cricketers
West Indies Twenty20 International cricketers
Saint Lucia Kings cricketers
1983 births
Living people
Jamaica Tallawahs cricketers